Waiblingen (Swabian: Woeblinge) is a town in the southwest of Germany, located in the center of the densely populated Stuttgart region, directly neighboring Stuttgart. It is the capital and largest city of the Rems-Murr district. , Waiblingen had 55,449 inhabitants (27,334 men and 28,115 women).

History
Waiblingen was first mentioned in Carolingian documents in 885 at the time of Charles the Fat. It received its town charter in 1250.

Waiblingen was the property of the Salian kings, from whom the Hohenstaufen dukes and kings inherited it. It is intimately tied to the conflict between Guelphs and Ghibellines in the 12th and 13th century. During the Siege of Weinsberg in 1140, the Hohenstaufens of Swabia (led by Conrad III of Germany) used "Wibellingen" - a version of the town name - as their rallying cry; "Wibellingen" subsequently became Ghibellino in Italian.

The town was almost completely destroyed in 1634 during the Thirty Years' War, when Imperial and Spanish troops sacked the city after the Battle of Nördlingen. Fires raged for more than a week, and most of Waiblingen's citizens were killed or had to flee. Rebuilding only began four years after this catastrophe; the existing old central part of the town dates back to the years between 1640 and 1700. Its fortifications are now well restored.

Incorporation
The following towns were incorporated into Waiblingen:
1 December 1971: Beinstein
1 January 1975:  Bittenfeld, Hegnach, Hohenacker, and Neustadt

Economy
Waiblingen houses the principal office of the world's biggest chainsaw manufacturer, Stihl. Engineering and technology multinational Robert Bosch GmbH has two factories in the city producing polymer and packaging technology.

It is also the location for the letter processing center for the Stuttgart region of the Deutsche Post.

Twin towns – sister cities

Waiblingen is twinned with:
 Baja, Hungary
 Devizes, England, United Kingdom
 Jesi, Italy
 Mayenne, France
 Virginia Beach, United States

Notable people 

 Alessandro Abruscia (1990, Waiblingen), an Italian-German footballer
 
 Jakob Andreae
 
 Anouschka Bernhard
 
 
 
 
 Giuseppe Catizone (1977, Waiblingen), an Italian and German footballer
 
 
 Luise Duttenhofer
 Eberhard II, Duke of Württemberg
 
 Otto Esswein
 Michael Fink
  (1970, Waiblingen), a German pianist
 
 Claus E. Heinrich
 
 
 Nadine Krause
 Leif Lampater
 Ludwig II, Count of Württemberg-Urach
 Giorgos Machlelis (1991, Waiblingen), a Greek-German footballer
 Bernd Mayländer
 Christian Mergenthaler
 
 
 Christoph Niemann
 Boris Palmer
 Achim Pfuderer
 
 Mathias Richling
 Günther Schäfer
 Patrick Schmollinger
 Wolfgang Straub
 
 
 
 
 Joachim Winkelhock
 Manfred Winkelhock
 Thomas Winkelhock

Honorary citizens 
 1883: Dr. med. Gustav Pfeilsticker
 1907: Ferdinand Küderli
 1930: Theodor Kaiser
 1932: Friedrich Schofer
 1934: Albert Roller
 1953: Emil Münz
 1967: Alfred Diebold
 1968: 
 1997: Dr. Ulrich Gauß
 1997:  (1932, Stuttgart), a German industrialist (Stihl)
 1997: Albrecht Villinger

References

External links

  
 Galerie Stihl Waiblingen in 360°-Panoramapictures

Towns in Baden-Württemberg
Rems-Murr-Kreis
Württemberg